Unión Comercio is a Peruvian football club based in the city of Nueva Cajamarca, San Martín, Peru.

History
Unión Comercio was 2010 Liga Departamental champion, when they defeated Atlético Belén.

In the 2010 Copa Perú, the club classified to the National Stage when they defeated Cultural Volante, Juventud Santa Rosa and Carlos A. Mannucci in the Region II's group A.

Unión Comercio was the 2010 Copa Perú Champion when they defeated Alianza Unicachi in the final. As a result, the team was promoted to the Peruvian First Division in the 2011 season for the first time in the club's history.

Historic Badges

Honours

National
Peruvian Segunda División:
Runner-up (1): 2022

Copa Perú:
Winners (1): 2010

Regional
Región II:
Winners (1): 2010

Liga Departamental de San Martín:
Winners (1): 2010

Liga Provincial de Rioja:
Winners (2): 2009, 2010

Liga Distrital de Nueva Cajamarca:
Winners (1): 2009
Runner-up (1): 2010

Under-20 team
Torneo de Promoción y Reserva:
Runner-up (1): 2015-II

Results

Performance in CONMEBOL competitions

A = appearances, P = matches played, W = won, D = drawn, L = lost, GF = goals for, GA = goals against.

Current squad

Notable players

Managers
 Hernán Lisi (1 January 2011 – 12 May 2011)
 Julio César Uribe (27 July 2011 – 24 April 2012)
 Mario Viera (29 April 2012 – 29 November 2012)
 Fernando Nogara (12 December 2012 – 2 May 2013)
 Johano Bermúdez (interim) (3 May 2013 – 16 May 2013)
 Edgar Ospina (17 May 2013–1?)
 Javier Arce (23 September 2013 – 17 December 2013)
 Agustín Castillo (1 January 2014 – 7 April 2014)
 Walter Aristizábal (9 April 2014–)

See also
List of football clubs in Peru
Peruvian football league system

References

External links

Región II: Union Comercio a la Nacional

Football clubs in Peru
Association football clubs established in 1994